Emily Jane Willingham (born 1968) is a US journalist and scientist. Her writing focuses on neuroscience, genetics, psychology, health and medicine, and occasionally on evolution and ecology.

She is the joint recipient with David Robert Grimes of the 2014 John Maddox Prize, awarded by science charity Sense about Science, for standing up for science in the face of personal attacks.

Education
Willingham received her bachelor's degree in English in 1989 and her PhD in biology in 2001, both from the University of Texas at Austin. She completed a fellowship in pediatric urology at the University of California, San Francisco, from 2004 to 2006, where she studied under Laurence S. Baskin.

Writing
Willingham's work has been published online at Scientific American, Aeon, San Francisco Chronicle, Washington Post, Slate, Undark, Knowable, The Scientist, and others and has appeared in print in several local, regional, and national outlets, including in single-issue publications for Centennial Media.

Willingham was a contributor to the Forbes network for several years and ran an informal blog, "A Life Less Ordinary", which she started in 2007 and which published its last post on November 25, 2011. At Forbes.com, Willingham focused on what she described as "the science they're selling you," which included the disproven link between vaccines and autism, as well as the Seralini affair. She has also written multiple articles for Slate.com about GMOs, childbirth, astronaut DNA, and autism, including about what the motivation might have been for Adam Lanza to carry out the Sandy Hook elementary school shooting. Her view is that his alleged Asperger's syndrome was not a contributing factor, but that untreated schizophrenia was a more likely cause of his actions. In addition, she has contributed to Discover, where she has argued that the autism epidemic may, in fact, just be the result of diagnostic substitution and increased awareness of the condition. She was called "one of the sharpest science writers in the blogosphere" by Steve Silberman.

In 2016, Willingham, along with co-author Tara Haelle, published The Informed Parent: A Science-Based Resources for Your Child's First 4 Years, which examines the science around several parenting-related controversies and common parenting concerns.

In 2020, Emily Willingham published her next book titled Phallacy. The book is a deep dive into penises in the animal kingdom within which she creates a new word for penis, intromittum, a more general description for all organs that relay sex cells between sexual mates of all species.

In 2021, she published another book, The Tailored Brain, that speaks on and debunks myths about diets, supplements, and brain training techniques said to improve brain function.

Research
Willingham has published 44 scientific papers, and, according to Google Scholar, her h-index is 22. With regard to her research, Willingham has said that talking about it "has always carried a frisson of the risque." Her research has also led her to what she describes as cool things, including ultrasound and surgery on a spotted hyena and plastic casting of the inside of the mammalian penis. Willingham's PhD research involved sex determination and the effects of pesticides and other environmental compounds on sex determination and development in the red-eared slider. She also has published on the effects of endocrine-disrupting chemicals such as atrazine.

Selected publications

Scientific papers

Books

References

External links

American urologists
Living people
American skeptics
University of Texas at Austin alumni
American endocrinologists
Women endocrinologists
St. Edward's University faculty
American bloggers
Texas State University faculty
1968 births
People from Waco, Texas
American women bloggers
21st-century American scientists
21st-century American journalists
21st-century American women scientists
21st-century American women writers
Scientists from Texas
Journalists from Texas
American science writers
Women science writers
American women non-fiction writers
Science bloggers
John Maddox Prize recipients
American women academics